Trenton Irwin (born December 10, 1995) is an American football wide receiver for the Cincinnati Bengals of the National Football League (NFL). He appeared on the 2005 Bravo series "Sports Kids Moms & Dads" with his sister Alyssa and father Craig. He played college football at Stanford.

Early years
Irwin attended and played high school football at William S. Hart High School.

College career 
Irwin played college football at Stanford. He finished his college career with 152 receptions for 1,738 receiving yards and five touchdowns, while also returning 20 punts for 230 yards. He also had at least one reception in 40 consecutive games.

Collegiate statistics

Professional career

Miami Dolphins 
Irwin went undrafted in the 2019 NFL Draft. He signed with the Miami Dolphins in April 2019. He was released from the Dolphins on August 31, 2019.

Cincinnati Bengals 
Irwin was signed to the Cincinnati Bengals practice squad on October 3, 2019. He was promoted to the active roster on December 27, 2019.

On September 5, 2020, Irwin was waived by the Bengals and signed to the practice squad the next day. He was elevated to the active roster on December 26 for the team's week 16 game against the Houston Texans, and reverted to the practice squad after the game. He signed a reserve/future contract on January 4, 2021.

On December 27, 2020, Irwin caught his first reception of his career which was a 5 yard gain against the Houston Texans from quarterback Brandon Allen.

On September 1, 2021, Irwin was waived by the Bengals and re-signed to the practice squad. He was promoted to the active roster on September 15, 2021. In Week 4, Irwin caught his first reception of 2021 for a 25-yard gain against the Jacksonville Jaguars.

On March 21, 2022, Irwin re-signed with the Bengals. He was waived on August 30, 2022, and signed to the practice squad the next day.

In Week 11, against the Pittsburgh Steelers, Irwin caught his first professional touchdown from quarterback Joe Burrow from one yard out. On November 22, 2022, Irwin was signed to the active roster. In Week 14 against the Cleveland Browns, he caught a 35 yard touchdown pass from Joe Burrow when the Bengals called a Flea flicker that left him open in the backfield. In Week 16 against the New England Patriots, Irwin played his most impressive professional outing to date. Out of four targets from quarterback Joe Burrow, he netted three receptions for 45 yards and two touchdowns. He narrowly missed a pass from Burrow in the end zone, which could have resulted in a third touchdown, which would have given him a perfect reception percentage in the 22–18 victory. Irwin played in nine games in the 2022 regular season. He finished with 15 receptions for 231 receiving yards and four receiving touchdowns.

NFL Career Statistics

References

External links 

Cincinnati Bengals bio
Stanford Cardinal bio

Living people
1995 births
American football wide receivers
Stanford Cardinal football players
Miami Dolphins players
People from Valencia, Santa Clarita, California
Players of American football from California
Sportspeople from Santa Clarita, California
Cincinnati Bengals players